The Farman F.460 Alizé was a 1930s French civil training and touring monoplane designed and built by Farman to meet a French air ministry requirement.

Design and development
In the early 1930s the French air ministry issued a specification for a two-seat training and sport aircraft for the government-sponsored Popular Aviation Movement.  It was a high-wing parasol monoplane with a wide-track landing gear for rough-field operation.  The Alizé appeared after aircraft from other companies and no French order was placed. Ten aircraft were built for the Spanish Republican government for training schools in the Murcia area.

Specifications

Notes

Bibliography

1930s French civil trainer aircraft
Alize
Parasol-wing aircraft
Single-engined tractor aircraft